Aero Warriors, also called aero-cars, is a nickname for four muscle cars developed specifically to race on the NASCAR circuit by Dodge, Plymouth, Ford and Mercury for the 1969 and 1970 racing seasons. The cars were based on production stock cars but had additional aerodynamic features. 

The first Aero Warrior was the 1969 Ford Torino Talladega. The Torino already had a fastback design; the Talladega added a longer, slightly rounded front end. The second Aero Warrior was the 1969 Mercury Cyclone Spoiler II. The Cyclone was nearly identical to the Torino with the only major distinctions being the front grille and rear tail lights.

Another aero car is the Dodge Charger Daytona, which was a redesign of the Charger 500 and had a more radical aerodynamic nose as well as a high-mounted wing at the rear, hitting 243mph on Chrysler's five-mile oval track. The final Aero Warrior was the 1970 Plymouth Superbird (based on the Plymouth Road Runner), which had the same aerodynamic additions as the Daytona. Because of their wings, the Mopar Aero Warriors are sometimes called the Winged Warriors. 

Due to NASCAR homologation rules a minimum number (500) of these cars had to be offered for sale to the public so there are approximately 3,000 of these cars in private ownership. The Aero Warriors were successful in winning many races, but NASCAR made rule changes that equalized the advantages in 1971. Plymouth made a Superbird prototype in 1971 but it did not go into production.

Faced with the breakout success of the Dodge Charger Daytona and the Plymouth Superbird, Ford planned to introduce a fifth Aero Warrior named the King Cobra, to once again rule in the sport. The vehicle is based in a Ford Torino, but with a long aerodynamic nose similar to the Daytona and the Superbird, however due to NASCAR making rule changes that equalised the advantages of the Aero Warriors, plus the new Ford president Lee Iaccoca, the King Cobra project was abandoned. It never saw a NASCAR track or a showroom and only three prototype cars were produced.

Legacy 
Every five years, fans and owners of Aero Warriors gather to celebrate the legacy of the rare vehicles. The 2019 Wing Car Reunion was held at Talladega Speedway, and in October, Aero Warrior cars completed laps at Atlanta Motor Speedway to celebrate the vehicles' 50th anniversary.

References

Chrysler
NASCAR terminology
Nicknames in sports